Owen James Cullivan Jr. (born June 10, 1921) is a former American football coach. He served as the head football coach at Murray State University from 1956 to 1959, compiling a record of 12–26–1, and had a coaching career that spanned over 40 seasons. He played college football for Murray State, and was on their 1948 championship team.

Early life and education
Cullivan was born on June 10, 1921, and grew up in Paris, Tennessee. He attended Grove High School, playing on their championship football team in 1940. In 1942, and from 1946 to 1948, he played college football for Murray State, and was left guard for their 1948 conference championship team. He missed seasons between 1943 and 1945 due to serving in World War II.

Coaching career
After graduating college with a bachelor's and master's degree, Cullivan started a coaching career, being named assistant at Fulton High School in Kentucky. After two years there, he returned to his alma mater as an assistant coach. When Murray State head coach Fred Faurot resigned in 1956, Cullivan was named the replacement. He finished his first season as head with a 6–4 record, with three of the four losses coming by one point.

His team compiled a 3–5–1 record in 1957, a 3–7 record in 1958, and a winless 0–10 in the following, leading to his firing in January 1960.

After leaving Murray State, Cullivan took a year off from coaching to work on a doctorate from University of Indiana. In 1961, he was hired by Eastern State College (now Eastern Kentucky University) as defensive coordinator. He resigned in 1964 to join Appalachian State University. He served as backfield coach for two years, and was associate professor of health and physical education.

After two seasons with Appalachian State, he was signed by Grove High School, where he attended from 1938–1941, as defensive coordinator and head coach. While there he coached his three sons, Jim, Bill, and Pat. When the school closed in 1969, he moved to Henry County High School, where he served for the next two years as their first football coach.

He retired after 1970, and sat out the next two years. He returned in 1973 as coach of North Stanley High School, saying, "I sat out (of coaching) two years, but I got restless. Raising cattle didn't work out." He left after five years, returning to college coaching with the Guilford Quakers as defensive line coach. He moved back to high school in 1979, joining Cawood High School as an assistant. He was promoted to head coach in 1980, and posted a 65–21 football record in nine seasons. He helped them achieve two undefeated years, and seven playoff berths. In 1985, he was awarded The Courier-Journal's annual Coach of the Year award.

Cullivan left the school in 1989 to become an assistant coach for Tennessee Wesleyan. He coached them for one year, and retired in 1991 at the age of 71, after a brief stint in the United Professional Football League (UPFL).

Later life
Cullivan celebrated his 100th birthday on June 10, 2021.

Head coaching record

College football

References

1921 births
Living people
Players of American football from Tennessee
People from Paris, Tennessee
Murray State Racers football coaches
Coaches of American football from Tennessee
Eastern Kentucky Colonels football coaches
Appalachian State Mountaineers football coaches
Guilford Quakers football coaches
Tennessee Wesleyan Bulldogs football coaches
American centenarians
Men centenarians